Police Academy 4: Citizens on Patrol is a 1987 American comedy film. It is the fourth installment in the Police Academy franchise. It was released on April 3, 1987 and is the sequel to Police Academy 3: Back in Training.

A group of Police Academy graduates are sent to train a group of newly recruited civilian officers. The original Police Academy cast reprise their roles in the film. Capt. Harris, not seen since the first installment, returns as the film's nemesis. In Police Academy 2 and 3, Capt. Mauser (played by Art Metrano) filled that role, but Metrano asked to be replaced for the remainder of the series after filming number 3. This was the last Police Academy film to feature Steve Guttenberg as Carey Mahoney.
This film also stars a young David Spade in his feature film debut, as well as featuring a brief appearance from pro skateboarder Tony Hawk as Spade's double in a skateboarding scene. Despite the commercial success, the sequel was panned by film critics.

Plot
Commandant Eric Lassard decides the police force is overworked and understaffed, so he comes up with the idea of recruiting civilian volunteers to work side by side with his officers in a program called "Citizens On Patrol" (COP).

Carey Mahoney and his friends Moses Hightower, Larvell Jones, Eugene Tackleberry, Zed, Sweetchuck, Laverne Hooks, and Debbie Callahan are in charge of training the civilians. The civilians include the enormous Tommy "House" Conklin (who Hightower used to babysit), gung-ho senior citizen Lois Feldman, Tackleberry's own father-in-law, and skateboarding delinquents Kyle and Arnie. The latter pair were caught by Capt. Harris, and the judge was about to throw the book at them until Mahoney speaks to the judge to let Arnie and Kyle join the COP program as alternative punishment. The judge agrees, and the boys are joined by their attorney, Butterworth.

Believing "the concept of citizens doing police work is asinine", Harris is determined to see the COP program fail and take over Lassard's job at the academy. When Lassard leaves on an overseas conference, Harris, and his right-hand man Lt. Proctor, are put in charge of the academy and Harris immediately plots to make the COP volunteers quit and leave police work to officers.

The volunteers, however, do well in their training. Mrs. Feldman excels in firing Tackleberry's .44 Magnum, and they bond amicably (she reminds him of his mother). In training in water safety and drowning victim rescue, Zed "rescues" a cadet but 'loses' his Mickey Mouse watch, saying it was the last thing he ever stole before joining the academy. However, he gains a love interest, a reporter/photographer Laura, who has come to view Lassard's COP program and becomes attracted to Zed. Unfortunately, Harris ruins the moment, insulting them both and inspiring Zed to replace Harris' Right Guard deodorant with mace, which burns his armpits. Despite pranks pulled on him during training, Harris is still determined to make the Citizens on Patrol program fail.

Jones learns that volunteers House, Kyle, and Arnie feel ready to go out and arrest criminals, so he, Mahoney, Hightower, and Tackleberry prank the boys, locking them in a prisoner transport van with Hightower, who is posing as a Voodoo practitioner who reanimates his "dead" brother (Tackleberry), as a Jason Voorhees-esque maniac with a chainsaw to make them take training more seriously.  Later, after Captain Harris yells at Zed again, calling him a disgrace, Laura comforts him, saying she thinks he is perfect.

After COP volunteers accidentally foil an undercover police sting, the program is suspended, much to Harris' delight. Mahoney believes he did it on purpose to shut down the COP program, paying him back by putting superglue on the mouthpiece of Harris' bullhorn, semi-permanently sticking the mouth guard to its rims. Sometime later, Harris gives some prominent citizens a tour of his precinct when Proctor is tricked into releasing every inmate at the precinct 19 jail, including a team of ninjas, and special guest Randall "Tex" Cobb. After the criminals imprison Harris and his guests, they escape into the street, only to run into Mrs. Feldman, who immediately informs the Lassard academy.

When Lassard's officers hear of the jailbreak, COP volunteers are dispatched with the regular officers to catch the escaped felons. After stopping a robbery and a high-speed air balloon chase, the felons are all recaptured. Meanwhile, House, Kyle, Arnie, and Butterworth save Harris and Proctor from drowning in the river after the latters' attempt (and failure) to participate in the chase, and Zed impresses his girlfriend Laura by saving Sweetchuck's life after they both fall out of a plane in mid-air. Several of the police chiefs who witness Lassard's program in action congratulate and compliment him on the program and his officers, much to Harris' dismay.

Cast

Staff at The Academy 
 Steve Guttenberg as Sergeant Carey Mahoney
 Bubba Smith as Sergeant Moses Hightower
 Michael Winslow as Sergeant Larvell Jones
 David Graf as Sergeant Eugene Tackleberry
 Tim Kazurinsky as Officer Carl Sweetchuck
 Leslie Easterbrook as Lieutenant Debbie Callahan
 Marion Ramsey as Sergeant Laverne Hooks
 Brian Tochi as Officer Tomoko "Elvis" Nogata
 Lance Kinsey as Lieutenant Carl Proctor
 G.W. Bailey as Captain Thaddeus Harris
 George Gaynes as Commandant Eric Lassard
 George R. Robertson as Commissioner Henry Hurst
 Bobcat Goldthwait as Officer Zed McGlunk
 Colleen Camp as Lieutenant Kathleen Kirkland-Tackleberry
 Andrew Paris as Officer Bud Kirkland

C.O.P. Program 
 Derek McGrath as Milt Butterworth
 Scott Thomson as Sergeant Chad Copeland
 Billie Bird as Mrs. Lois Feldman
 David Spade as Kyle Rumford
 Brian Backer as Arnie Lewis
 Tab Thacker as Tommy "House" Conklin
 Corinne Bohrer as Laura

Others

Music 
Motown Records issued a soundtrack album on record and cassette; until 2013, this was the only film of the series to have a soundtrack album released.

 Rock the House - Darryl Duncan (5:29)
 It's Time to Move - S.O.S. Band (3:19)
 Dancin' Up a Storm - Stacy Lattisaw (3:29)
 Let's Go to Heaven in My Car - Brian Wilson (3:30)
 The High Flyers (Police Academy Theme - Montage) - Robert Folk (2:04)
 Citizens on Patrol - Michael Winslow And The L.A. Dream Team (4:16)
 Rescue Me - Family Dream (4:54)
 I Like My Body - Chico DeBarge (3:56)
 Winning Streak - Garry Glenn (3:12)
 Shoot for the Top - Southern Pacific (2:46)

Reception

Box office 
The film debuted at number one in the United States weekend box office and would go on to gross a total of $28,061,343. It grossed $76,819,000 worldwide.

Critical response 
On Rotten Tomatoes, the film has a rare approval rating of 0% based on reviews from 20 critics, with an average rating of 2.26/10. The website's critical consensus reads, "Utterly, completely, thoroughly and astonishingly unfunny, Police Academy 4: Citizens on Patrol sends a once-innocuous franchise plummeting to agonizing new depths." On Metacritic the film has a score of 26% based on reviews from 8 critics, indicating "Generally unfavorable reviews". Audiences polled by CinemaScore gave the film a grade B−.

Janet Maslin of The New York Times wrote: "The Police Academy series seems to shoot for an ever younger crowd. The optimum viewer for Police Academy 4: Citizens on Patrol would be a 10-year-old boy. Even better, it would be a whole pack of them. That's not to say the film isn't funny; it means only that the sense of humor being addressed is very specific. Stay away if drawing room farce is what you're after."

The film was nominated for a Golden Raspberry Award for Worst Original Song for the song "Let's Go to Heaven in My Car". (It was the only film in the entire Police Academy film series to receive a Razzie nomination of any sort.)

References

External links 
 
 
 
 

1987 films
1980s police comedy films
4
American sequel films
1980s English-language films
Films shot in Toronto
Warner Bros. films
Films scored by Robert Folk
Films directed by Jim Drake (director)
Films with screenplays by Gene Quintano
1987 directorial debut films
1987 comedy films
Films produced by Paul Maslansky
1980s American films